Softpedia is a software and tech news website based in Romania. It indexes, reviews and hosts various downloadable software and reports news on technology and science topics.

Website
Softpedia hosts reviews written by its staff—each review includes a 1 to 5 star rating and often a public rating to which any of the site's visitors may contribute.

Products are organised in categories which visitors can sort according to most recent updates, number of downloads, or ratings. Free software and commercial software (and their free trials) can also be separated. Softpedia displays virtual awards for products free of adware, spyware and commercial tie-ins. Products that include these unrelated and/or unanticipated components and offers (which are known as potentially unwanted programs) are marked so visitors can make educated choices about them.

Softpedia does not repack software for distribution. It provides direct downloads of software in its original provided form, links to developers's downloads, or both. Softpedia hosts some products on its own servers in case they are unavailable from their developers' sites.

The site is owned by SoftNews NET SRL, a Romanian company.

In December 2008  SoftNews NET SRL also launched Autoevolution an automotive news and reference web site.

See also
 Internet in Romania

References

External links 
 

Information technology companies of Romania
Download websites
Internet properties established in 2001